Feeler may refer to:
 Antenna (biology)
 Feeler (Pete Murray album), 2003
 Feeler (Marcella Detroit album), 1996
 Feeler (Toadies album), 2010
 Feeler fish
 Feeler gauge
 The Feelers - New Zealand rock band